Astrothelium leucosessile is a species of corticolous (bark-dwelling), crustose lichen in the family Trypetheliaceae. Found in Panama, it was formally described as a new species in 2016 by Robert Lücking, Matthew Nelsen, and André Aptroot. Both the thallus and the  contain lichexanthone, which cause these structures to fluoresce yellow when lit with a long-wavelength UV light. The species epithet leucosessile refers to the whitish colour and sessile habit of the pseudostromata. The characteristics of the lichen that distinguish Astrothelium leucosessile from others in genus Astrothelium are its well delimited, whitish pseudostromata, which are prominent to sessile. Astrothelium phlyctaena is somewhat similar in appearance, but that species does not have conspicuous, sessile pseudostromata.

References

leucosessile
Lichen species
Lichens described in 2016
Taxa named by André Aptroot
Taxa named by Robert Lücking
Lichens of Central America